José Wilker Almeida (20 August 1944 – 5 April 2014) was a Brazilian film, stage, and television actor and director. The actor gained fame in telenovelas like Roque Santeiro (1985), but became known internationally for his role as Vadinho, the husband who returns from the dead to tempt Sônia Braga in the movie Dona Flor and Her Two Husbands (1976).

Career
Wilker was born on August 20, 1944 in Juazeiro do Norte. He started his career as a radio announcer at a radio in Ceará, where he was born. He moved to Recife and worked in the theater as a member of Movimento de Cultura Popular (MPC). The group brought culture and lessons in reading, writing, and politics. MPC was banned during the military repression in the 1960s, and Wilker moved to Rio de Janeiro.

He began working in cinema in Rio, which was at the forefront of Brazilian experimental and national cinema. He was 19 when he appeared in his first film, in 1965 (A Falecida), starring Fernanda Montenegro. In Rio, Wilker also got involved with the Teatro Ipanema theater group, headed by Rubens Corrêa and Ivan de Albuquerque. At Teatro Ipanema he rose to underground fame with his role in Fernando Arrabal's O Arquiteto e o Imperador da Assíria (The Architect and the Emperor of Assyria) (1970), and starred in his own A China é Azul (China is Blue) (1972). He worked in television soap operas for decades. 

He debuted in 1971 on the popular show Bandeira 2 (Flag 2) written by Dias Gomes and televised on the Rede Globo network. Wilker gained acclaim for his role as the protagonist in the soap opera Roque Santeiro, starring with Regina Duarte and Lima Duarte. Between 1997 and 2002, he directed many episodes of Sai Down. In  1979, he was cast in the movie Bye Bye Brazil and in 1986 in  The Man in the Black Cape. Among his most memorable roles in movies was Tiradentes in the film The Conspirators of 1972, Vadinho – which broke box office records in theaters – in Dona Flor and Her Two Husbands in 1976, as the politician Tenorio Cavalcanti in The Man in Black Cover of 1986 and Anthony Advisor of War Canudos of 1997. In miniseries JK, he played an older Juscelino Kubitschek during his time as President of the Republic.  In 1992 he worked in Medicine Man along with Sean Connery and Lorraine Bracco.

Death
José Wilker died on April 5, 2014 of a heart attack in Rio de Janeiro, aged 69.

Filmography

Film

Television

Director
1983: Louco Amor
1984: Transas e Caretas
1987:  Corpo Santo
1987: Carmem (telenovela)
1997-2002: Sai de Baixo

References

External links

1944 births
2014 deaths
Brazilian male telenovela actors
Brazilian male film actors
Brazilian people of Dutch descent
People from Juazeiro do Norte